Lento may refer to:

 Lento (skipper), a genus of skippers in the family Hesperiidae
 Lento, Haute-Corse, a French commune located on the island of Corsica
 Lento speech, a relatively slow manner of speaking

Music
 Lento (band), an Italian instrumental metal band; see Ufomammut
 Lento (Harmaja album)
 Lento (music), a tempo indication meaning "slow"
 Lento (Na Yoon-sun album)
 Lento (Skempton), an orchestral composition by Howard Skempton
 "Lento" (Lauren Jauregui and Tainy song)
 "Lento" (Julieta Venegas song)
 "Lento" (RBD song)
 "Lento" (Sara Tunes song)
 "Lento" (Thalía song)
 "Lento", a song by Tainy from the 2020 EP The Kids That Grew Up on Reggaeton